Charles Francis Carrel (born 7 November 1993) is an English professional poker player.

Career
Carrel plays on the online poker platform PokerStars under the nickname "Epiphany77". He turned a £10 (US$15) deposit into over £3,000,000 by April 2017. In May 2015, Carrel had won over £1 million playing poker. He won the PokerStars European Tour in Monte Carlo defeating 215 other players in the high roller tournament. Earlier in the year he finished 5th in Malta  tournament earning €183,800. He won a poker tournament in London in November of 2014, winning £108,625 in the process.

In August 2019, Carrel won the £50,000 buy-in no-limit hold’em eight-max event at the Triton Poker Super High Roller Series London, earning $1,611,620 and 1020 POY points.

In 2020, Carrel won the WPT Online Super High Roller tournament for $600,250.

As of August 2020, Carrel has a career live tournament winnings of over $9,500,000.

Personal life
Carrell was born on the 7th of November, 1993 in St. Brelade, Jersey. When he was 7 years old, his family moved to London, where he still lives. Prior to poker, Carrel made a living as a drug dealer.

References

External links
Charlie Carrel Hendon Mob profile

English poker players
1993 births
Living people